Raymondinidae are the only family in the trilobite superfamily Raymondinacea, which lived during the Middle and Upper Cambrian.

Taxonomy 
The Raymondinidae consists of three subfamilies, but is assumed to be polyphyletic.
 Raymondininae (= Pilgrimiidae) 
Raymondina, Amquia, Exigua (= Brassicicephalus), Llanoaspidella, Paracedaria 
 Cedariniinae
Cedaria, Cedarina
 Llanoaspidinae
Llanoaspis, Arcuolimbus, Genevievella, Metisaspis

References 

Ptychopariida
Trilobite families
Cambrian trilobites
Cambrian first appearances
Cambrian extinctions